Aliona Valeriya Kavanagh (née Vilani on 1 May 1984), also known by her stage name Aliona Vilani, is a Russian-Kazakh TV personality and was a professional dancer in the BBC series of Strictly Come Dancing.

Biography

Vilani started learning ballet when she was five years old. She moved to Russia with her parents at age 9 and started ballroom dancing at age 11, continuing ballet. In 1997, aged 13, she moved to the United States and joined the Kaiser Dance Academy in Brooklyn, New York. In 2001 she was part of the US Ballroom team for the National Dance Congress that won the Amateur Ballroom category.

Vilani turned professional at the age of 17. Since 2006 she has lived in Los Angeles where she competed, performed and coached. Her speciality is 10 Dance, she is also skilled in Salsa, Hip Hop and Jazz. In 2008–2009 she appeared in Dancing with the Stars Arena Tour in the U.S. In 2009 she appeared three times as a guest professional dancer on Dancing with the Stars in Hollywood.

In 2014 Vilani was featured in theatre show Licence to Thrill as the lead female dancer.

In June 2017 Vilani gave birth to a daughter named Bella.

Strictly Come Dancing
Highest and lowest scoring performances per dance

Vilani first participated in series 7 in 2009, where she partnered Rav Wilding: they were eliminated in week 3 following a dance-off with actress Lynda Bellingham and her dance partner Darren Bennett.

In 2010 she appeared for the first time on the Strictly Come Dancing Live Tour where she partnered actor Ricky Groves. They danced the American Smooth and the Paso Doble. She also partnered Matthew Cutler in the professional dances. In April 2010 rehearsals started for the Strictly Come Dancing Professionals Tour in which she partnered Matthew Cutler & two weeks later the opening night started the 12-week tour.

Vilani was runner up in the 2010 series of Strictly Come Dancing, partnered with Matt Baker. Vilani and Baker then went on to compete and win the 2011 Strictly Come Dancing Live Tour.

She returned in 2011 for the 9th series of the show, where she and partner Harry Judd of pop-rock band McFly went on to win the competition, beating Chelsee Healey in the public vote and coming top in the final judges leader-board. Vilani and Judd then went on to compete and win the 2012 Strictly Come Dancing Live Tour.

Vilani returned for the 2012 series of Strictly Come Dancing, where she was paired with television presenter Johnny Ball. A training accident in the three-week interval resulted in torn ligaments for Vilani, causing her to retire at least temporarily from the show. She was replaced by Iveta Lukošiūtė who, with Ball, went on to be eliminated in the first week. Vilani did however return in the final group dance alongside Ball, and later took part in the 2012 Christmas Special, partnering Fabrice Muamba. In a TV interview in October 2017, Ball claimed Vilani faked the injury, with Vilani denying the allegation and saying she would take legal advice over Ball's comments.

In June 2013 it was announced that Vilani would not be competing in series 11. However, she reportedly reacted angrily, stating that it was "not her decision to leave, and I had planned to be on the show and now I have to make new plans". However, on 2 September 2013 it was further reported that professional dancer Natalie Lowe had a foot injury and that she would be replaced by Vilani. Her partner for series 11 was championship golfer Tony Jacklin but the couple were the first to be eliminated (in week 2).

Vilani appeared in a short special edition of Strictly Come Dancing featuring Jayne Torvill and Christopher Dean, filmed in support of the BBC Children in Need charity in November 2013. She also appeared on the 2013 Christmas Special, partnering Matt Goss; they scored 35 for their American Smooth.

Vilani returned for the 12th series of Strictly in 2014; she and her partner Gregg Wallace were voted off in round two, making Vilani the first dancer to be voted off first in two consecutive years.

In December 2014, Aliona Vilani won the Christmas Special partnering Louis Smith. They earned a perfect score of 40 from the judges for their quickstep to "Jingle Bells" and won after the judges' and studio audience's scores were combined.

In September 2015, Vilani returned for the thirteenth series of the show and partnered singer from The Wanted, Jay McGuiness. In December 2015 they won the Strictly Come Dancing final, making her the first professional to win the show twice. A few days following their win Vilani announced she would not be returning to the series. Vilani and McGuiness then went on to compete and win the 2016 Strictly Come Dancing Live Tour.

Series performances and results

Series 7: with celebrity partner Rav Wilding

Series 8: with celebrity partner Matt Baker

Series 9: with celebrity partner Harry Judd

 On week 6, the score was given out by guest judge, actress Jennifer Grey, who was temporarily replacing Goodman.

Series 11: with celebrity partner Tony Jacklin

Series 12: with celebrity partner Gregg Wallace

Series 13: with celebrity partner Jay McGuiness

References

1984 births
Living people
Kazakhstani female dancers
Kazakhstani emigrants to Russia
People from Los Angeles
Strictly Come Dancing winners
Ballroom dancers
Russian emigrants to the United States
Kazakhstani emigrants to the United States
Kazakhstani expatriates in England
Russian expatriates in England
American expatriates in England